Ivan Opačak (born 23 April 1980) is a Bosnian professional basketball coach and former player.

Opačak played for HKK Široki of the Adriatic League and Bosnian League. He previously played for Turów Zgorzelec.

Opačak was member of the Bosnia and Herzegovina national basketball team at EuroBasket in 1999 and 2001.

Notes

External links
 Ivan Opačak at aba-liga.com
 Ivan Opačak at acb.com

1980 births
Living people
ABA League players
Bosnia and Herzegovina basketball coaches
Bosnia and Herzegovina expatriate basketball people in Spain
Bosnia and Herzegovina men's basketball players
CB Murcia players
HKK Široki players
KK Cedevita players
KK Vojvodina Srbijagas players
Liga ACB players
OKK Spars coaches
OKK Spars players
SAV Vacallo Basket players
Small forwards
Turów Zgorzelec players